Jean Étienne de Boré (27 December 1741 – 1 February 1820) was a Creole French planter, born in Kaskaskia, Illinois Country, who was known for producing the first granulated sugar in Louisiana. At the time, the area was under Spanish rule. His innovation made sugar cane profitable as a commodity crop and planters began to cultivate it in quantity. He owned a large plantation upriver from New Orleans. De Boré's plantation was annexed to the city of New Orleans in 1870, and is now the site of Audubon Park, Tulane University, and Audubon Zoo. 

De Boré was a prominent planter in the area when the United States made the Louisiana Purchase and acquired the former French territories west of the Mississippi River. In 1803 the American governor of the territory appointed de Boré as the first mayor of New Orleans under the U.S. administration.

Early life and education
Jean Étienne de Boré (known as Étienne) was born to French colonists in Kaskaskia, Illinois Country, then under French control as part of La Louisiane. His parents sent him to France to be educated. He spent most of his early life there. On leaving school he entered French military service in the Musketeers of the Guard, which was part of the royal household and very prestigious.

After a visit to Louisiana on business, he was transferred to the cavalry. De Boré left the army with the rank of captain and settled in the French colony.

Marriage and family
He married Marie Marguerite d'Estréhan, from one of the most prominent French families of colonial Louisiana. Her father Jean Baptiste d'Estrehan was the Royal Treasurer of French Louisiana.

Sugar granulation and New Orleans' first mayor
De Boré owned a large plantation a few miles upriver of New Orleans on the Mississippi River, which was annexed by the city of New Orleans in 1870, and is now the site of Audubon Zoo, Tulane University, and Audubon Park. He, and more than 80 slaves of African and American descent, originally cultivated indigo on the land, but when this product lost its market as a result of competition from Guatemala during Spanish control of the colony, he ordered his fields converted to the production of sugar cane. 

He set up a sugar mill on the plantation to process the sugar. In 1795, following the instructions of two Cubans, Mendez and Lopez, laborers de Boré enslaved produced the first granulated sugar known in the colony. Although granulated sugar had been known for centuries in the Old World, granulation in Louisiana created a huge demand for the cultivation and processing of sugar cane. Responding to the worldwide demand for sugar, it became the colony's primary commodity crop. Under Spanish rule, Louisiana began to generate profits.

In late 1803, after the United States acquired New Orleans in the Louisiana Purchase, the Governor of the Orleans Territory, William C. C. Claiborne, appointed de Boré the first mayor of New Orleans under the United States rule. De Boré's service to the city had begun during the brief transitional French governorship of Pierre Clément de Laussat. In May 1804, De Boré resigned to look after his personal affairs.

He died at about eighty years old and was interred in New Orleans' Saint Louis Cemetery No. 1. One of his grandchildren, Charles Gayarré, became a noted historian of Louisiana in the late 19th century.

New Orleans has a Boré Street, in honor of the city's first Mayor.

References

External links 
 "Étienne de Boré", New Orleans Public Library's transcription of a Works Progress Administration (1930s) compilation of local research on New Orleans' mayors.
Étienne de Boré's tenure as mayor, Kendall's History of New Orleans, Chapter 4
 

 

1741 births
1820 deaths
Louisiana Creole people
French slave owners
Mayors of New Orleans
People from Kaskaskia, Illinois
Musketeers of the Guard